The HD Pentax D FA 24-70mm F2.8 ED SDM WR is an interchangeable standard zoom lens announced by Ricoh on September 24, 2015. It covers a full frame (35mm) imaging circle.

References
Specifications

24-70
Camera lenses introduced in 2015